Alexandra Kosinski (born March 29, 1989) is an American distance-runner. She broke the U.S. high school girl's national record for the 1600 meters in 2007. She went on to attend and run with University of Oregon in cross country and track.

Running career

High school
Kosinski attended and ran with Oak Ridge High School from El Dorado Hills, California. She and another Californian high schooler, Jordan Hasay, were two of the fastest high school women in the state and frequently raced each other before they would both go to University of Oregon.

Collegiate
Kosinski attended University of Oregon with an athletic scholarship. She majored in Sociology and maintained a 3.83 GPA while in college. On January 29, 2011, she set the school's record for the indoor 5000 meter at 15:44.60. Kosinski third in 2011 and placed eighth in the women's 5000 meter finals at the 2012 NCAA Division I Outdoor Track and Field Championships.

References

Oregon Ducks women's track and field athletes
Living people
1989 births
People from El Dorado Hills, California
American female middle-distance runners
American female long-distance runners
Track and field athletes from California
Oregon Ducks women's cross country runners
21st-century American women